Fudbalski klub Železničar Smederevo is a Serbian football club based in Smederevo.

History
The club was founded in 1930. The stadium of Železničar has about 300 blue and white seats. The most popular player of the team was Ljubiša Stamenković, who later played for OFK Beograd.

In the 2003–04 season the team got relegated from third league, Serbian League West. One of the most successful seasons in their history was in 2001–02 season when they almost got into the Second League of FR Yugoslavia.

See also
List of football clubs in Serbia

References

External links
 Profile, results and tables club www.srbijasport.net 
 Profile, results and tables club (youth) www.srbijasport.net 

Football clubs in Serbia
Association football clubs established in 1930
1930 establishments in Serbia
Smederevo